The 2021 season is Sport Club Internacional's 111th season in existence. As well as the Campeonato Brasileiro, the club competes in the Copa do Brasil, the Campeonato Gaúcho and the Copa Libertadores.

Season review

Pre-season 
On March 2, 2021, Internacional announced the hiring of new manager Miguel Ángel Ramírez. After a late finish to the 2020 season due to the COVID-19 pandemic, most first team players did not return to training until March 9 to prepare for the remainder of the Campeonato Gaúcho.

First-team squad

As of 20 April 2021

Transfers

Transfers in

Loans in

Transfers out

Loans out

Competitions

Overview

Campeonato Gaúcho

League table

Matches

Knockout stage

Semi-finals

Finals

Copa Libertadores

Round of 16 

The draw for the round of 16 was held on 1 June 2021.

Serie A

League table

Results summary

Results by round

Matches
The league fixtures were announced on 24 March 2021.

Copa do Brasil

Third round

References

External links

Sport Club Internacional seasons
Brazilian football clubs 2021 season